The 1954 Holy Cross Crusaders football team was an American football team that represented the College of the Holy Cross as an independent during the 1954 college football season. In its 11th year under head coach Eddie Anderson, the team compiled a 3–7 record. The team played its home games at Fitton Field in Worcester, Massachusetts.

Schedule

Statistical leaders 
Statistical leaders for the 1954 Crusaders included:
 Rushing: Lou Hettinger, 357 yards and 1 touchdown on 81 attempts
 Passing: Jack Stephans, 800 yards, 74 completions and 8 touchdowns on 149 attempts
 Receiving: Bob Dee, 236 yards and 2 touchdowns on 25 receptions
 Scoring: Bob Rosmario, 48 points on 8 touchdowns
 Total offense: Jack Stephans, 637 yards (800 passing, minus-163 rushing)
 All-purpose yards: Lou Hettinger, 613 yards (365 rushing, 248 receiving)

References

Holy Cross
Holy Cross Crusaders football seasons
Holy Cross Crusaders football